Kacper Kozłowski (born 7 December 1986) is a Polish sprint athlete who specializes in the 400 metres.

International competitions

References

External links
 IAAF profile

1986 births
Living people
Polish male sprinters
Sportspeople from Olsztyn
Athletes (track and field) at the 2012 Summer Olympics
Olympic athletes of Poland
World Athletics Championships medalists
European Athletics Championships medalists
Universiade medalists in athletics (track and field)
Universiade silver medalists for Poland
Medalists at the 2009 Summer Universiade
21st-century Polish people